Prince Seweryn Franciszek Światopełk-Czetwertyński (b. 18 April 1873 in Warsaw – 19 June 1945 in Edinburgh, Scotland) was a Polish landowner, entrepreneur and politician. He belonged to a cadet branch of the Czetwertyński family, historically one of the princely houses of Poland and Lithuania.

He was a pupil at the Realschule in Riga and was a member of the Polish student fraternity Arkonia. He went on to study at the University of Bonn.

He became a member of the Russian Duma in 1906 and after Poland regained her independence, he was elected to the Sejm from 1919 until 1935. During World War II, he was a prisoner of Nazi Germany, and was imprisoned at both the Buchenwald and Auschwitz concentration camps. He died of exhaustion barely two months after liberation, having newly arrived in the United Kingdom.

Married to Zofia Przeździecka, their son Włodzimierz (1907-1965) and elder grandchildren were born in Poland, but during World War II, they fled to Britain, eventually taking up residence in North America.

References

1873 births
1945 deaths
Politicians from Warsaw
Nobility from Warsaw
People from Warsaw Governorate
Seweryn Franciszek
Popular National Union politicians
National Party (Poland) politicians
National League (Poland) members
Members of the 1st State Duma of the Russian Empire
Members of the Polish National Committee (1914–1917)
Members of the Legislative Sejm of the Second Polish Republic
Members of the Sejm of the Second Polish Republic (1922–1927)
Members of the Sejm of the Second Polish Republic (1928–1930)
Members of the Sejm of the Second Polish Republic (1930–1935)
University of Bonn alumni
Buchenwald concentration camp survivors
Auschwitz concentration camp survivors
World War II prisoners of war held by Germany
Polish emigrants to the United Kingdom